Kyllini is a port town and a community in the municipal unit of Kastro-Kyllini, Elis, Greece. It is situated on the Ionian Sea coast, 11 km west of Andravida, 28 km northeast of  Zakynthos and 39 km northwest of Pyrgos. From the port of Kyllini there are several ferry connections to the Ionian islands Zakynthos and Cephalonia. It was the terminus of the now dismantled Kavasila–Kyllini railway.

History
Kyllini was first mentioned by Homer in his epic poem Iliad where Otos from Kyllini was killed during the Trojan War. The ruins of the medieval town Glarentza are situated in Kyllini. The town was named after Cyllene, a port town of ancient Elis. Following the Ottoman invasion of the Duchy of Athens in 1458, the Arvanite population migrated westward toward Kalavryta and later Glarentza. The town remained largely Arvanitic-speaking until a mixture of language attrition and assimilation from Greece.

Population

See also
List of settlements in Elis
Otus of Cyllene

References

External links

GTP - Kyllini

Populated places in Elis
Kastro-Kyllini